Wolsfeld is a municipality in the district of Bitburg-Prüm, in Rhineland-Palatinate, western Germany. It is around 7 km south-west of Bitburg, and around 10 km from the Luxembourg border.

References

Bitburg-Prüm